Peter Fenton (born July 1972) is an American venture capitalist based in Silicon Valley. He is a general partner at Benchmark, a venture capital firm. Fenton has steadily worked his way up the Forbes Midas List of the 100 top technology investors, starting at no. 94 in 2007, then rising to no. 62 in 2008 and no. 50 in 2009. Fenton was ranked no. 4 when Forbes resumed publishing its Midas List in 2011 and was described as the "most productive venture capitalist on our list". In 2012, Fenton was ranked no. 5 on the Forbes Midas List and was no. 2 in 2015. He has been a perennial member on the Midas List since 2007.

Education and early career
Fenton graduated with a BA in philosophy and an MBA from Stanford University, where he was elected Phi Beta Kappa and an Arjay Miller Scholar, and spent seven years as a partner with Accel Partners. He began his career at Bain & Company and was also an early employee at Virage before joining Benchmark in 2006.

Career

Benchmark 
Fenton's investing style has been summarized as, “Wait until right before the company’s rising ‘adoption curve’ meets the declining ‘risk curve.’” He served on the board of Twitter and backed Twitter when it had only 25 employees. He invested early in Yelp in 2006 and sits on its board.

Noted for his expertise in open source technology, Fenton has invested in JBoss (acquired by Red Hat), SpringSource (acquired by VMware) and Zimbra, which was later acquired by VMware. The VMware acquisition occurred on the same day that Facebook acquired FriendFeed, another company in Fenton’s portfolio. He led Benchmark's investments in Wily Technology (acquired by CA Technologies), Reactivity (acquired by Cisco), Coremetrics (acquired by IBM), Xensource (acquired by Citrix), Zimbra (acquired by Yahoo!), Minted, Quip (acquired by Salesforce), and Polyvore (acquired by Yahoo).

In addition to Twitter and Yelp, Fenton also serves on the boards of (in alphabetical order) Cockroach Labs, Digits, Docker (formerly DotCloud), Elasticsearch, Engine Yard, Hortonworks, Lithium Technologies, New Relic, Optimizely, Revinate, Zendesk, and Zuora. In December 2014, Fenton "had one of the most unusual days in venture history" when two of his investments, Hortonworks and New Relic, went public the same day. In February 2014, he was awarded the TechCrunch Crunchie for Venture Capitalist of the Year.

References

American computer businesspeople
Living people
American financial businesspeople
Stanford University alumni
American venture capitalists
1972 births
Directors of Twitter, Inc.
Midas List